Farrah Yousef (born July 20, 1989) is a Syrian singer who was the first runner-up on the second season of the television program Arab Idol in 2013.

Biography

Early life and early career 
Farrah Yousef was born on July 20, 1989 in Tartus, a city on the Mediterranean coast of Syria. Her first performance on stage was at the age of seven at the Abu Dhabi Cultural Center, where she sang "Sit Al Hbayib" in the presence of a large crowd of diplomats and the presence of Sheikh Zayed's wife Sheikha Fatima. Farrah won the applause of the audience, and since then she has aspired to become an artist.

After graduation from high school, Farrah gained a scholarship to study medicine in Italy, where she gained experience in western styles of singing and learned to sing in English, French and Italian. In 2011 Yousef had the chance to perform the theme song of a Syrian series, "Wilada Mina Al Khassira". In 2012 she performed the theme song for two series, "Bet Amer" and "Al Amemy".

Arab Idol
Following the success of the first season of Arab Idol, MBC launched the second season on March 8, 2013. Back in Syria, the civil war was affecting the whole country, resulting in Yousef being hesitant to audition. She was encouraged by her friends and family to achieve her dream. She said that watching the program inspired her to give it a try. She almost failed to leave Syria as her car was caught in the middle of a shootout as she left Damascus to audition in Beirut.

Television viewers first saw Yousef during the audition episodes at the beginning of Arab Idols second season. The show's judges included Ragheb Alama, Nancy Ajram, Ahlam and Hassan El Shafei. Farrah performed "Ifrah Ya Albi" by Umm Kulthum and got accepted to the next round.
In Beirut, where the competition was held, outdoor cafes put up big screens and the sound of Yousef’s voice drifted down streets.

Yousef said her performance mirrored the way she feels when singing on stage when she often thinks of her family. She has said that she feels a sense of responsibility to the audience and that there is always that deep happiness mixed with fear. She says that she tries to make people love one another again using the healing power of music. Yousef performed many kinds of music during the competition, including Arabic pop songs and Classic songs by great Arabic singers like Umm Kulthum, Fairuz, Asmahan and Najwa Karam, and also Someone Like You by Adele.

Songs

Arab Idol performances

References

External links 
Official Facebook page

1989 births
Living people
Singers who perform in Classical Arabic
Syrian Alawites
People from Tartus
21st-century Syrian women singers
Contestants from Arabic singing competitions